Jo Alison Feiler (born 1951) is an American photographer.

Her work is included in the collections of the Getty Museum, Los Angeles, the Tate Museum, London, the National Portrait Gallery, London the Brooklyn Museum, New York, and the Metropolitan Museum of Art, New York. 47 of her photographs are included in the Los Angeles County Museum of Art collection.

References

Living people
1951 births
20th-century American women artists
21st-century American women artists
20th-century American photographers
21st-century American photographers
American women photographers